The fifth season of the anime series Inuyasha aired in Japan on ytv from May 19, 2003, through January 19, 2004. It was produced and broadcast in High Definition. Based on the manga series of the same title by Rumiko Takahashi, the anime was produced by Sunrise. The season continues the half demon Inuyasha's and the high school girl Kagome Higurashi's journey alongside their friends Shippo, Miroku and Sango to obtain the fragments of the shattered Jewel of Four Souls, a powerful jewel that had been hidden inside Kagome's body, and keep the shards from being used for evil.

The anime is licensed for release in North America by Viz Media. The English dub of the fifth season was broadcast on Cartoon Network as part of its Adult Swim programming block from July 30, 2005, through March 22, 2006.

The opening themes for this season were "Grip!" by Every Little Thing for episodes 111-126 and "One Day, One Dream" by Tackey & Tsubasa for episodes 127-138.



Episode list

Notes

References

2003 Japanese television seasons
2004 Japanese television seasons
Season 5